Dude, What Would Happen is an American live-action reality series that aired on Cartoon Network originally as part of its CN Real block which aired a line of live-action reality shows promoted in the summer season of 2009. The show premiered on August 19, 2009, preceded by another CN Real series Bobb'e Says. The show is hosted by three male teenagers (C.J. Manigo, Jackson Rogow, and Ali Sepasyar) who wondered what would happen if some wild event, scheme or experiment were to occur. The three teens attempt to create the event themselves and consult experts ("The Lab Dudes") when needed.

The series went on to have four seasons aired throughout a span of two years, in which the series eventually ended in September 2011, as the series was not announced for a renewal by Cartoon Network.

Dude, What Would Happen was one of only two CN Real shows (the other being Destroy Build Destroy) to have been renewed for additional seasons, as the other CN Real shows had already been cancelled earlier due to critically negative reception.

Cast
 C.J. Manigo
 Jackson Rogow
 Ali Sepasyar
 OGHRM

Production
In the "Dudes Make It Happen" weekend special, it was revealed that new episodes were coming. These episodes ranked #1 in their timeslot among boys  6–11 on all television.

The show was listed as returning for Cartoon Network's 2010–2011 season. The next season began airing on October 6, 2010.

In February 2011, Vincent Cariati renewed his contract to serve an additional four seasons as the series' showrunner, co-creator and co-executive producer. The show had four seasons aired, but was not announced as a returning series, automatically cancelling the series altogether.

Episodes

Series overview

Season 1 (2009–10)

Season 2 (2010)

Season 3 (2011)

References

External links
 
 

2009 American television series debuts
2011 American television series endings
2000s American television series
2010s American television series
American educational television series
2000s American reality television series
Cartoon Network original programming
English-language television shows
American non-fiction television series
Science education television series
Television series about teenagers
2010s American reality television series